Nerses Yeritsyan (born February 23, 1971, in Yerevan) is deputy president of the Central Bank of Armenia and former Minister of Economy. Since Armenia's independence he has actively been involved in the design and implementation of economic policies in Armenia.

Biography
In 1988–1993 he studied at Yerevan State Institute of National Economy (degree in macroeconomics), then completed post-graduate studies at the Macroeconomics Department and received a PhD diploma in 1995.

In 1993–1994 Yeritsyan worked as chief expert of National Assembly of Armenia, then worked at Central Bank of Armenia as assistant of President, head of monetary and lending policy department, Chief adviser of President and acting head of the financial monitoring center. He was a member of Central Bank Board.

In 2001–2003 he was adviser to the Executive Director from the Dutch group of the International Monetary Fund.
In June, 2007, according to the Decree on the appointment of Members of the Cabinet by the President Serzh Sargsyan, Yeritsyan became RA Minister of Trade and Economic Development, reformed to Ministry of Economy in 2008.

Executive Board member of Armenian International Policy Research Group.

Speaks Armenian, Russian and English.

Books
 2003 Textbook on Modern Banking in Armenia, co-author

References

 Official biography
 Biography

1971 births
Living people
Government ministers of Armenia